Dal Lake is a small mid-altitude lake (1,775 m above sea level) near the  village of Tota Rani in Kangra district of Himachal Pradesh state in northern India.

The word Dal means 'lake' in several languages of the western Himalayas. The lake is surrounded by deodar trees and is considered to be a sacred spot as there is small Shiva mandir (shrine) on its bank. There are different kinds of fish that live in this lake. The lake has greenish water. This lake is situated near Rikkarmar on Balan Dhar. There is also a temple dedicated  to  'Lord Driveshwar' built by sage Agastya. This is also known as "Bhagsunag Lake".

Location
Distance from Dharamshala: 11 km

See also
Battle of Sirhind, 1758

References

External links

 Himachal Pradesh Tourism Department
 Dal lake Dharamshala

Lakes of Himachal Pradesh
Geography of Kangra district
Dharamshala
Sacred lakes of India